
Yonghe may refer to:

 Yonghe District (永和區), New Taipei, Taiwan
 Yonghe Dawang (永和大王), Chinese fast-food restaurant that specializes in noodles

Locations in China
 Yonghe County (永和县), Linfen, Shanxi
 Yonghe Subdistrict (永和街道), Luogang District, Guangzhou, Guangdong
 Yonghe Temple (雍和宮), the Panchen Lama's temple in Beijing

Towns
 Yonghe, Jinjiang, Fujian
 Yonghe Town, Zhengning County, Gansu
 Yonghe, Lianshan County, in Lianshan Zhuang and Yao Autonomous County, Guangdong
 Yonghe, Xingning, Guangdong
 Yonghe, Fenggang County, Guizhou
 Yonghe, Weng'an County, Guizhou
 Yonghe, Jidong County, Heilongjiang
 Yonghe, Liuyang (永和镇), a town of Liuyang City, Hunan

 Yonghe, Ji'an County, Jiangxi
 Yonghe, Leshan, in Jinkouhe District, Leshan, Sichuan
 Yonghe, Shangyu, Zhejiang

Townships 
 Yonghe Township, Hailun (永合乡), Heilongjiang
 Yonghe Township, Zhengning County (永和乡), in Zhengning County, Gansu
 Yonghe Township, Anyang County (永和乡), Henan
 Yonghe Township, Bin County, Heilongjiang (永和乡)
 Yonghe, Hengshan (永和乡), Hengshan County, Hunan.
 Yonghe Township, Jiuzhaigou County (永和乡), in Jiuzhaigou County, Sichuan
 Yonghe Township, Mao County (永和乡), in Mao County, Sichuan
 Yonghe Township, Shimian County (永和乡), in Shimian County, Sichuan

Historical eras
Yonghe (136–141), era name used by Emperor Shun of Han
Yonghe (345–346), era name used by Emperor Mu of Jin
Yonghe (416–417), era name used by Yao Hong, emperor of Later Qin
Yonghe (935–936), era name used by Wang Yanjun, emperor of Min
Yonghe (1721), era name used by Zhu Yigui